The MTV Europe Music Award for Best R&B was first given out during the 1997 ceremony and retired after the 2006 ceremony, but was later brought back for the 2022 ceremony. Alicia Keys was the most awarded artist in this category, with three wins.

Winners and nominees
Winners are listed first and highlighted in bold.

1990s

2000s

2020s

See also
 MTV Europe Music Award for MTV Amour
 MTV Europe Music Award for Best Urban
 MTV Video Music Award for Best R&B Video

References

MTV Europe Music Awards
Awards established in 1997
Rhythm and blues